Jandun is a commune in the Ardennes department in northern France.

"Romy" mineral water is produced here.

Population

Sights and monuments 
 The church, Notre-Dame de Jandun, dates from the 12th and 13th centuries. It has 19th century frescoes, a Baroque altar and some sculpted capitals. Stained glass and statues decorate the interior. 
 In the grounds of the church is a sculpted stone cross, classified as a  monument historique in 1963 by the French Ministry of Culture.

People linked to the commune 
 Jean de Jandun (circa 1285–1323) was a French philosopher, theologian, and political writer.
 The Duhan family, lords of part of Jaudun :
Jean Duhan, counsellor to the king.
Jacques Égide du Han (1685–1746), also known as Jacques Égide Duhan de Jandun, Huguenot soldier who served for twelve years as tutor to Frederick the Great.
 Émile Bourquelot, born in Jandun on 21 June 1851, chemist and professor of pharmacy.

See also
Communes of the Ardennes department

References

Communes of Ardennes (department)
Ardennes communes articles needing translation from French Wikipedia